The 2020 WCHA Men's Ice Hockey Tournament was the 61st tournament in conference history. It was scheduled to be played between March 6 and March 21, 2020 on campus locations. On March 12, 2020, the WCHA announced the remainder of the tournament was cancelled due to the COVID-19 pandemic in the United States.

Format
The first two rounds of the postseason tournament featured a best-of-three games format. The top eight conference teams participated in the tournament. Teams were seeded No. 1 through No. 8 according to their final conference standings, with a tiebreaker system used to seed teams with an identical number of points accumulated. The higher seeded teams each earned home ice and host one of the lower seeded teams.

The final would have been a single game held at the campus site of the highest remaining seed.

Conference standings

Bracket

Note: * denotes overtime periods

References

WCHA Men's Ice Hockey Tournament
WCHA Men's Ice Hockey Tournament
WCHA Men's Ice Hockey Tournament